Island League may refer to:

 Island Soccer League
 Shikoku Island League